Bela Palanka (Serbian Cyrillic: Бела Паланка) is a town and municipality located in the Pirot District of southeastern Serbia. According to the 2011 census, the population of the town is 8,143, and the population of the municipality is 12,126. In ancient times, the town was known as Remesiana in Dacia Mediterranea. The name Bela Palanka means 'white town'.

History

Ancient Bela Palanka
The town was originally settled by the Dacians and was known under the ancient name of Aiadava or Aeadaba. Thracians inhabited the area until their assimilation into contemporary ethnic groups in the area.

After the Romans conquered Moesia in 75 BC, the new castrum (imperial domain with estates) and municipium was known initially as Ulpianorum and then Remesiana (Moesi) and stood along the Via Militaris between Naissus and Serdica.

Emperor Justinian had following strongholds in the district of Remesiana:

The patron saint of Romania, Nicetas of Remesiana, was a 4th-century bishop at Remesiana. Peter the Hermit was defeated by the Byzantines in the north and regrouped at an evacuated Bela Palanka, gathering the harvest before heading to Constantinople.

Excavations include well-preserved castrum dating to 4th century and a hoard of 260 coins minted during the rule of Constantine I, Theodosius I, Tiberius Claudius Nero. During the 1096 People's Crusade the town, left abandoned by its inhabitants, was briefly occupied by the pilgrims led by Peter the Hermit, Walter of Breteuil and Rainald of Breis.

Ottoman Empire
During the centuries of Ottoman control, Bela Palanka was the site of a major caravanserai (or han) along the Tsarigrad Road. Ottoman authorities ordered the first such caravanserai be built in the settlement (then named Izvor) from wood in 1598-99, during the Long Turkish War, largely due to persistent attacks on travelers by hajduks. This structure deteriorated after a few decades and was replaced by a larger and more durable caravanserai made of stone, commissioned by the local governor, Musa Pasha. This han differed from others in the region because of its large size and because it had separate large rooms for harems of dignitaries. The interior of the han was painted by an artist brought from Buda. To honor its patron, the name of the settlement was then changed to Musa-paša Palanka, from which the town's current name was derived.

Modern Serbia

From 1929 to 1941, Bela Palanka was part of the Morava Banovina of the Kingdom of Yugoslavia.

Geography
Bela Palanka is a small town in the southeast of the country and is surrounded by countryside and mountains. The town is accessible from the nearby city of Niš by the Niš Express buses that run from Niš to Pirot, Babušnica, Dimitrovgrad, and Sofia.

Climate
Bela Palanka has a warm-summer mediterranean climate (Köppen climate classification: Csb), that's very close to a humid subtropical climate (Köppen climate classification: Cfa).

Settlements
Aside from the town of Bela Palanka, the municipality consists of the following villages:

Demographics

According to the 2011 census results, the municipality has 12,126 inhabitants.

Ethnic groups
The ethnic composition of the municipality:

Economy
The following table gives a preview of total number of registered people employed in legal entities per their core activity (as of 2018):

Gallery

See also
 Subdivisions of Serbia
 Archaeological Sites of Great Importance (Serbia)

References

External links

 

Populated places in Pirot District
Municipalities and cities of Southern and Eastern Serbia
Roman towns and cities in Serbia
Moesia